The following list comprises the mountain ranges of U.S. State of California designated by the United States Board on Geographic Names and cataloged in the Geographic Names Information System.

Mountain ranges
 Adobe Hills
 Alabama Hills
 Alexander Hills
 Alvord Mountain
 Amargosa Range
 Amedee Mountains
 Antelope Hills
 Argus Range
 Arica Mountains
 Avawatz Mountains
 Bacon Hills
 Bald Hills (Humboldt County)
 Bald Hills (Lassen County)
 Bald Mountain Range
 Baldwin Hills
 The Balls
 Berkeley Hills
 Bernasconi Hills
 Big Blue Hills
 Big Maria Mountains
 Big Valley Mountains
 Bighorn Mountains
 Bird Hills
 Bissell Hills
 Black Hills (Contra Costa County)
 Black Hills (Imperial County)
 Black Hills (Kern County)
 Black Hills (Riverside County)
 Black Hills (San Bernardino County)
 Black Mountains
 Bodie Hills
 Bodie Mountains
 Box Springs Mountains
 Brawley Peaks
 Briones Hills
 Bristol Mountains
 Buena Vista Hills (Kern County)
 Buena Vista Hills (San Diego County)
 Bullion Mountains
 Burnt Hills
 Cady Mountains
 Calico Mountains
 Calico Peaks
 Caliente Range
 Call Mountains
 Calumet Mountains
 Campbell Hills
 Capay Hills
 Cargo Muchacho Mountains
 Carson Range
 Cascade Range
 Casmalia Hills
 Castle Mountains
 Cathedral Range
 Chalk Buttes
 Chalk Hills
 Chalk Mountains
 Chemehuevi Mountains
 Chino Hills
 Chocolate Mountains
 Cholame Hills
 Chowchilla Mountains
 Chuckwalla Mountains
 Ciervo Hills
 Clark Mountain Range
 Clark Range
 Clear Lake Hills
 Clipper Mountains
 Coast Ranges
 Colton Hills
 Confidence Hills
 Coppersmith Hills
 Coso Range
 Cottonwood Mountains (Inyo County)
 Cottonwood Mountains (Lassen County)
 Cottonwood Mountains (Riverside County)
 Coxcomb Mountains
 Coyote Hills (Alameda County)
 Coyote Hills (Plumas County)
 Coyote Mountains
 Crafton Hills
 Crystal Hills
 Crystal Range
 Cuyamaca Mountains
 Darwin Hills
 Deadman Hills
 Dead Mountains
 Devils Hole Hills
 Diablo Range
 Diamond Mountains
 Domenigoni Mountains
 Dominguez Hills
 Dougherty Hills
 Dublin Hills
 Dumont Hills
 Dunnigan Hills
 Eagle Hills
 Eagle Mountains
 East Coyote Hills
 Elk Hills
 Elk Range
 Elkhorn Hills
 El Paso Mountains
 English Hills
 Fenner Hills
 Fish Creek Mountains
 Fletcher Hills
 Flynn Hills
 Fort Sage Mountains
 Four Brothers
 Fry Mountains
 Funeral Mountains
 Gabilan Range
 Granite Mountains
 Grapevine Hills
 Grapevine Mountains
 Gravel Hills
 Gravel Range
 Greenhorn Mountains
 Greenwater Range
 Griswold Hills
 Guijarral Hills
 Hemme Hills
 Hexie Mountains
 Hoodoo Hills
 Horned Toad Hills
 Horse Hills
 Horse Range
 Ibex Hills
 Indio Hills
 In-Ko-Pah Mountains
 Inyo Mountains
 Irish Hills
 Iron Mountains
 Ivanpah Mountains
 Jacalitos Hills
 Jacumba Mountains
 Jamul Mountains
 Jurupa Mountains
 Kalmia Hills
 Kelsey Range
 Kelso Mountains
 Kettleman Hills
 Kilbeck Hills
 Kilgore Hills
 King Range
 Kingston Range
 Kit Fox Hills
 Klamath Mountains
 Kramer Hills
 Kreyenhagen Hills
 La Loma Hills
 La Panza Range
 Laguna Mountains
 Lakeview Mountains
 Larkspur Hills
 Las Aguilas Mountains
 Las Alturas
 Las Colinas
 Las Lomas
 Last Chance Range
 Lava Bed Mountains
 Lava Mountains
 Little Chuckwalla Mountains
 Little Maria Mountains
 Little Mule Mountains
 Little Piute Mountains
 Little San Bernardino Mountains
 Little Signal Hills
 Lompoc Hills
 Long Buttes
 Los Buellis Hills
 Los Jinetes
 Los Viejos
 Lost Hills
 Marble Mountains (San Bernardino County)
 Marble Mountains (Siskiyou County)
 Mayacmas Mountains
 McCoy Mountains
 Mecca Hills
 Merriam Mountains
 Mescal Range
 Mesquite Hills
 Mesquite Mountains
 Mid Hills
 Middle Hills
 Mineral Range
 Mitchel Range
 Montezuma Hills
 Mopah Range
 Mount Buchon
 Mud Hills
 Mule Mountains
 Nelson Range
 New Range
 New York Mountains
 Newberry Mountains
 North Pinyon Mountains
 Oat Hills (Colusa County)
 Oat Hills (Mariposa County)
 Oat Hills (San Diego County)
 Oat Hills (Yuba County)
 Ogilby Hills
 Old Dad Mountains
 Old Woman Mountains
 Ord Mountains
 Orocopia Mountains
 Owlshead Mountains
 Palen Mountains
 Palo Verde Mountains
 Palos Verdes Hills
 Panamint Range
 Panhandle Hills
 Panoche Hills
 Panorama Hills
 Paradise Range
 Partlett Mountains
 Pedley Hills
 Peralta Hills
 Pine Hills
 Pinto Mountains
 Pinyon Mountains
 Piute Mountains
 Piute Range
 Pleito Hills
 Point of Rocks
 Potrero Hills (Richmond)
 Poverty Hills
 Providence Mountains
 Puente Hills
 Pyramid Hills
 Quail Mountains
 Rand Mountains
 Rawson Mountains
 Red Hills (San Luis Obispo County)
 Red Hills (Tuolumne County)
 Resting Spring Range
 Ritter Range
 Riverside Mountains
 Rodman Mountains
 Rosamond Hills
 Rosecrans Hills
 Sacramento Mountains
 Saddle Peak Hills
 Sagehen Hills
 Saline Range
 Salmon Mountains
 Salt Spring Hills
 San Bernardino Mountains
 San Emigdio Mountains
 San Felipe Hills (Santa Clara County)
 San Felipe Hills (San Diego County)
 San Gabriel Mountains
 San Jacinto Mountains
 San Joaquin Hills
 San Jose Hills
 San Leandro Hills
 San Marcos Mountains
 San Rafael Hills
 San Rafael Mountains
 San Ysidro Mountains
 Sand Hills
 Santa Ana Mountains
 Santa Cruz Mountains
 Santa Lucia Range
 Santa Margarita Mountains
 Santa Monica Mountains
 Santa Rosa Hills (Inyo County)
 Santa Rosa Hills (Riverside County)
 Santa Rosa Mountains
 Santa Susana Mountains
 Santa Teresa Hills
 Santa Ynez Mountains
 Sawtooth Mountains
 Sawtooth Range (San Bernardino County)
 Sawtooth Range (San Diego County)
 Scodie Mountains
 Scott Bar Mountains
 Scott Mountains
 Shadow Mountains
 Shale Hills
 Shandin Hills
 Sheep Hills
 Sheep Hole Mountains
 Shelton Buttes
 Sherburne Hills
 Ship Mountains
 Sierra Azul
 Sierra de Salinas
 Sierra Madre Mountains
 Sierra Nevada
 Sierra Pelona Mountains
 Silurian Hills
 Simi Hills
 Siskiyou Mountains
 Skedaddle Mountains
 Slate Range
 Soda Mountains
 Solomon Hills
 Sonoma Mountains
 South Hills
 Spangler Hills
 Sperry Hills
 Stepladder Mountains
 Summit Range
 Superstition Hills
 Sweetwater Mountains
 Sweitzer Hills
 Sylvania Mountains
 Talc City Hills
 Tecopa Hills
 Tehachapi Mountains
 Tejon Hills
 Telephone Hills
 Temblor Range
 The Badlands
 The Girdle
 The Palisades
 Three Sisters (Siskiyou County)
 Three Sisters (Riverside County)
 Three Sisters (Los Angeles County)
 Tierra Blanca Mountains
 Topatopa Mountains
 Trainer Hills
 Trinity Alps
 Trinity Mountains
 Tucalota Hills
 Tumey Hills
 Turtle Mountains
 Twin Peaks
 Vaca Mountains
 Valjean Hills
 Vallecito Mountains
 Venice Hills
 Verdi Range
 Verdugo Mountains
 Volcan Mountains
 Volcanic Hills
 Vontrigger Hills
 Warner Mountains
 Waterman Hills
 West Coyote Hills
 West Riverside Mountains
 Whipple Mountains
 White Hills (Inyo County)
 White Hills (Santa Barbara County)
 White Mountains
 Whitehorse Mountains
 Widow Valley Mountains
 Woods Mountains
 Yountville Hills
 Yuha Buttes

See also

List of mountain peaks of North America
List of mountain peaks of Greenland
List of mountain peaks of Canada
List of mountain peaks of the Rocky Mountains
List of mountain peaks of the United States
List of mountain peaks of Alaska
List of mountain peaks of California
List of the major 4000-meter summits of California
List of the major 3000-meter summits of California
List of California fourteeners

List of mountain peaks of Colorado
List of mountain peaks of Hawaii
List of mountain peaks of México
List of mountain peaks of Central America
List of mountain peaks of the Caribbean
California
Geography of California
:Category:Mountains of California
commons:Category:Mountains of California
Physical geography
Topography
Topographic elevation
Topographic prominence
Topographic isolation

References

External links

United States Geological Survey (USGS)
Geographic Names Information System @ USGS
United States National Geodetic Survey (NGS)
Geodetic Glossary @ NGS
NGVD 29 to NAVD 88 online elevation converter @ NGS
Survey Marks and Datasheets @ NGS
Bivouac.com
Peakbagger.com
Peaklist.org
Peakware.com
Summitpost.org

 
 

Lists of landforms of California
California, List of mountain ranges of
California, Mountain Ranges